Wairoa District is a Territorial authority district in the North Island of New Zealand. The Wairoa District Council is headquartered in the largest town, Wairoa. The district falls within the Hawke's Bay Region.

The district has an area of 4,130 square kilometres, of which 4,077 square kilometres are land.

The Wairoa District covers the northern half of the Hawke's Bay coast, and extends from Māhia Peninsula to Lake Waikaremoana, and south to the mouth of the Waikare River.

Mayor Craig Little JP was elected as mayor in the 2013 local elections.

The district has been known historically as 'Te Wairoa'. In keeping with the district's vision of being bilingual by 2040, the use of the phrase 'Te Wairoa' when referring to the district is steadily increasing. Wairoa itself is Māori for "long water", referring to the length of the tranquil river that runs throughout the town.

The Ruakituri River and the Māhia Peninsula are tourist destinations found in the district.

Council history

Wairoa County was established in 1876 and a separate Wairoa Borough was created in 1909. The two merged into the Wairoa District in the 1989 local government reforms.

In 2014, following the election of a new Council and the appointment of a new Chief Executive, the district embarked on an ambitious programme of attracting novel and high-tech industry to the district in an effort to arrest and reverse gradual population decline and loss of services that the community had been suffering from for the previous 20 years.

A $5M investment by central government in improved medical facilities, and, commencing July 2014, an increased emphasis by the Wairoa District Council on economic development (particularly aimed at encouragement of diversification of agribusiness, ecotourism, digital creative industry attraction, and attraction of new and returning residents) has led to an increasingly positive community view of the district's future.

As a result of these economic development efforts, in 2016, Rocket Lab announced that it was establishing its Orbital Launch Site (known as Launch Complex 1) for its Electron Vehicle on the Māhia Peninsula. The first test launch was in May 2017. The Electron vehicle is capable of delivering satellites into Low Earth Orbit, using innovative New Zealand technology.  The section of Te Wairoa coastline along which satisfactory space launch viewing experiences are likely is known as 'Space Coast New Zealand' – a more modest analogue of the  Florida Space Coast in the United States. The New Zealand Space Agency has been established to manage New Zealand space treaties and activity.

Demographics

Wairoa District had a population of 8,367 at the 2018 New Zealand census, an increase of 477 people (6.0%) since the 2013 census, and a decrease of 117 people (−1.4%) since the 2006 census. There were 2,988 households, comprising 4,194 males and 4,173 females, giving a sex ratio of 1.01 males per female. The median age was 38.6 years (compared with 37.4 years nationally), with 1,965 people (23.5%) aged under 15 years, 1,506 (18.0%) aged 15 to 29, 3,462 (41.4%) aged 30 to 64, and 1,434 (17.1%) aged 65 or older.

Ethnicities were 47.5% European/Pākehā, 65.7% Māori, 3.3% Pacific peoples, 2.2% Asian, and 1.1% other ethnicities. People may identify with more than one ethnicity.

The percentage of people born overseas was 6.8, compared with 27.1% nationally.

Although some people chose not to answer the census's question about religious affiliation, 36.1% had no religion, 41.1% were Christian, 13.1% had Māori religious beliefs, 0.1% were Hindu, 0.5% were Muslim, 0.3% were Buddhist and 0.9% had other religions.

Of those at least 15 years old, 609 (9.5%) people had a bachelor's or higher degree, and 1,740 (27.2%) people had no formal qualifications. The median income was $22,600, compared with $31,800 nationally. 465 people (7.3%) earned over $70,000 compared to 17.2% nationally. The employment status of those at least 15 was that 2,682 (41.9%) people were employed full-time, 945 (14.8%) were part-time, and 459 (7.2%) were unemployed.

Education

Wairoa has one mainstream secondary school, Wairoa College, which caters for students between the years of 7 and 13. Te Kura Kaupapa Maori O Ngati Kahungunu O Te Wairoa is a composite school providing for years 1 to 13, teaching in the Māori language

Wairoa Primary, Tiaho, and Frasertown are the primary schools that offer education to students in years 1 to 6. Ohuka, Te Mahia, Nuhaka, Ruakituri, Mohaka, Waikaremoana, Tiniroto, Tutira, Kotemaori, and St Joseph's School offer education to students in the years 1 to 8. The latter is a special Catholic character school.

References

External links

Wairoa District Council

 
Districts of New Zealand